Halimey bin Abu Bakar is a Malaysian politician from the People's Justice Party (PKR), a component party of the Pakatan Harapan (PH) coalition. He is also the incumbent Selangor State Legislative Assembly for the Seri Setia state seat since 2018.

Election results

References

External links 
 

Living people
Year of birth missing (living people)
People from Selangor
Malaysian people of Malay descent
Malaysian Muslims
People's Justice Party (Malaysia) politicians
Members of the Selangor State Legislative Assembly
21st-century Malaysian politicians